The government of the Derg consisted of Unitary Marxist-Leninist one-party system with communist and later socialist ideology. Opposing feudal system of Ethiopia, the Derg abolished land tenure in March 1975 and began sweeping land reform under Land Reform Proclamation. All means of goods have been therefore nationalized by the regime including housing, land, farms, and industry. 

The term "Ethiopian socialism" embodying slogan "self-reliance", the dignity of labor, and "the supremacy of the common good" allowed peasants to freely distribute their land and form peasant associations. In 1984, the Derg formed Workers Party of Ethiopia (WPE) headed by Mengistu Haile Mariam and formalized the establishment of the People Democratic Republic of Ethiopia in 1986. 

The Derg devoted itself aligning Eastern bloc (Soviet Union, Cuba, and Eastern European states) from the beginning with Soviet Union considered "natural ally to Ethiopia". However, the fall of communism in East Europe in 1989 contributed decline of socialism and loss of connection with the Soviet Union—by March 1990–socialism was waned away and the Derg renamed its ruling party as the Ethiopian Democratic Party (EDP), with membership open to non-Marxists.

Provisional Military Government of Socialist Ethiopia 
Upon deposing Emperor Haile Selassie on 12 September 1974 and seizing its power, the Derg adopted title such as "committee", consisting provisional administrative council of soldiers which has socialist and military ideology. Initially, the Derg was popular after they came to power with slogan "Ethiopia First", "Land to the peasants", and "Democracy and Equality to all". All means of good nationalized, including land, housing, farms, and industry. In January and February 1975, the regime nationalized all banks and insurance firms and seized control of practically every important company.  

The Derg promoted "Ethiopian socialism", embodying slogan such as "self-reliance", the dignity of labor, and "the supremacy of the common good". On 4 March 1975, the Derg as a council proclaimed sweeping land reforms and drafted Land Reform Proclamation, aiming to eliminate complex land tenure system. This phenomenon could allow the peasants to take over the land and encourage themselves into "peasant associations", while the government, partly for ideological reasons, did not control the process. The peasants rather be able to redistribute land among their members, or to enter into collective forms of land cultivation. By September 1977, the member of the association had increased to 24,700, with membership of over 4 million persons according to Ministry of Agriculture and Settlements handout.

The Derg initially had approach to Western Bloc such as the United States and Western European countries, but shifted to Eastern Bloc (Soviet Union and Warsaw Pact) due to lack of US support to Ethiopia and recurring human rights violations in the country. The military regime foreign policy characterized by military defense capabilities against "historical enemies of Ethiopia". Influenced by Marxist-Leninist ideology and Marxist concepts of society, the Derg foreign policy had similar policy especially with strong commitment with the Soviet Union, which was considered "the natural ally to Ethiopia".

In 1984, the Derg junta transformed itself into Workers Party of Ethiopia (WPE) and formalized its rule by establishing the People's Democratic Republic of Ethiopia (PDRE) in 1986.

People's Democratic Republic of Ethiopia

In September 1987, Mengistu Haile Mariam proclaimed Ethiopia as the Ethiopian People's Democratic Republic and the Derg became the Ethiopian Workers Party (EWP). Following an attempted coup in 1989 against Mengistu, socialism was abandoned in 1990 following the fall of communism in Eastern Europe. Mengistu's government lost access to cheap fuel and its arms supply. This led to free marketing policies allowing opposition groups to join unity party. By March 1990, socialism entirely waned and the ruling party Workers Party Ethiopia (WPE) was renamed the Ethiopian Democratic Unity Party (EDUP), with membership open to non-Marxists.

References

Derg
Government of Ethiopia